Pterygota bequaertii is a species of flowering plant in the family Malvaceae. It is found in Cameroon, Republic of Congo, Democratic Republic of the Congo, Ivory Coast, Gabon, Ghana, and Nigeria. It is threatened by exploitation as a timber tree. The wood has the trade name koto.

References

Sterculioideae
Vulnerable plants
Taxonomy articles created by Polbot
Taxa named by Émile Auguste Joseph De Wildeman